Arnošt Pazdera (16 September 1929 – 27 October 2021) was a Czech footballer who played as a midfielder. He played in 19 matches for the Czechoslovakia national team from 1952 to 1958.

References

External links
 

1929 births
2021 deaths
Czech footballers
Association football midfielders
Czechoslovakia international footballers
Place of birth missing
MFK Chrudim players
AC Sparta Prague players
Dukla Prague footballers
FK Teplice players
Dukla Pardubice players